Esso Petroleum Co Ltd v Mardon [1976] EWCA Civ 4 is an English contract law case, concerning misrepresentation. It holds that the divide between a statement of opinion and fact becomes more factual if one holds himself out as having expert knowledge.

Facts
Mr Mardon was buying a petrol station franchised by Esso Petroleum Co Ltd. Esso told him they had estimated that the throughput of a petrol station in Eastbank Street, Southport, would be 200,000 gallons a year; however, the local council had made a decision regarding planning permission which meant that there would be no direct access from the main street and therefore fewer customers. The estimate provided by Esso did not take this into account despite their knowledge of the decision. Mr Mardon bought the petrol station and business did not go well. From 1964, Mr Mardon negotiated a lower rent with Esso but was still losing money. Esso then brought an action for possession against Mr Mardon, who counterclaimed for damages of Esso's breach of warranty or negligence under Hedley Byrne.

Lawson J held there was no contractual warranty and damages for negligent misstatement were limited to losses before 1964. Mr Mardon appealed.

Judgment
Lord Denning MR held there was a contractual warranty and damages were not limited.

Lord Denning MR distinguished Bisset v Wilkinson because each party was 'equally able to form an opinion.' The damages awarded were for the loss suffered, not the loss of a bargain. He went on and said, if there had been no warranty (which there was) there would still be negligent misrepresentation liability in tort. It was argued that when a contract resulted, there was no tort liability, relying on Clark v Kirby-Smith, when Plowman J said a negligent solicitor was not liable in tort, only contract, based on Sir Wilfrid Greene MR in Groom v Crocker. But these were old and the tort duty 'is comparable to the duty of reasonable care which is owed by a master to his servant, or vice versa'.

There is a duty to negotiate with care,

Ormrod and Shaw LJJ concurred.

See also

English contract law
Misrepresentation in English law

Notes

English misrepresentation case law
Lord Denning cases
1976 in British law
Court of Appeal (England and Wales) cases
1976 in case law
ExxonMobil litigation
Standard Oil